Love Dot Com is a 2009 Oriya film produced & directed by Raqhat Quddus. This film is a love story of two lovers, who has family rivalry. The movie is a remake of 1991 Malayalam movie Godfather.

Plot
The story centers around the rivalry between two families  headed by Bijay Mohanty & Snigdha Mohanty. Hero Raj (Sabyasachi Mishra) is the only son of Bijoy Mohanty and heroine Debajani (Megha Ghosh) is the daughter of Snigdha Mohanty. Raj & Debajani are studying in the same college. Both pretend to fall in love in order to seek revenge for their own families. But gradually both found they are indeed in love each other & decided to marry.

Cast
Sabyasachi Mishra as Raj
Megha Ghosh as Debajani
Bijay Mohanty
Snigdha Mohanty	
Pupinder Singh
Harihara Mahapatra		
Tandra Roy		
Kuna Tripathy		
Ratan Meher
Mihir Das (guest appearance)	
Sambhavna Seth as item girl 	
Mumaith Khan		
Badal Mohanty		
Mika Singh

Soundtrack
The Composer of the film is Prem Anand

References

External links 
 
 

2009 films
2000s Odia-language films
Odia remakes of Malayalam films